Electrified is the sixth album by German hard rock group Pink Cream 69, released in 1998. It features guest appearances of singers D.C. Cooper of (Royal Hunt) and Ralf Scheepers of (Primal Fear) on the song Over The Fire.

Track listing

Personnel 
 David Readman – vocals
 Alfred Koffler – guitar
 Dennis Ward – bass guitar
 Kosta Zafiriou – drums

Guest Musicians:
 Sandy Campos (backing vocals) - Gone Again
 D.C. Cooper (vocals) - Over The Fire
 Ralf Scheepers (vocals) - Over The Fire

Additional Information:

 Includes a second version of "Gone Again" as "hidden track"
 Released in the USA as "PC69" with different front cover
 Brazilian release with complete redesigned booklet
 SPV Re-Release 2005, Booklet: with additional photos and linernotes from Dennis Ward

External links 
 Pink Cream 69 official website

1998 albums
Pink Cream 69 albums
Massacre Records albums
SPV GmbH albums
Victor Entertainment albums